Broers is a Dutch patronymic surname meaning "Broer's (son)". Broer and Broeder mean "brother" in Dutch. A nickname for a younger sibling is likely the origin of the given name, which is by now rare in the Netherlands. The surname may sometimes have originated from any of the other meanings of "brother". Variant forms are Broeders, Broer, Broere, Broerse and Broersen. People with this surname include:

Alec Broers, Baron Broers (born 1938), Australian electrical engineer 
Frank Broers (born 1977), Dutch football defender
Frans Broers (1944–2013), Dutch writer known as Jacq Vogelaar
Huub Broers (born 1951), Belgian New Flemish Alliance politician 
Jasper Broers (1682-1716), Flemish landscape and battle painter
Johnny Broers (born 1951), Dutch racing cyclist
Léon Broers (fl. 1928), Belgian long-distance runner
Broeders
Ben Broeders (born 1995), Belgian pole vaulter
Ilse Broeders (born 1977), Dutch bobsledder 
Broer
Bert Broer (1916–1991), Dutch physicist and mathematician, e.g. known for the Broer–Kaup equations
Christa Broer (born 1945), Dutch writer known as Anna Enquist
Jan-Martin Bröer (born 1982), German rower
Broerse / Broersen
Joost Broerse (born 1979), Dutch football defender
Nadine Broersen (born 1990), Dutch heptathlete and high jumper

See also
Broers (band) - South African music band named "Brothers"
Broer
Broeren

References

Dutch-language surnames
Patronymic surnames